Jason Edward Carter (born September 15, 1982) is a former professional football wide receiver who is currently a free agent. He previously played for the Minnesota Vikings and the Carolina Panthers of the National Football League. Carter played college football at Texas A&M.

Early years
As a senior at Caldwell High School, Carter threw for 1,087 yards and rushed for 599 as a quarterback.

College career
Carter played at Texas A&M as a QB/WR from the 2002–2005 seasons. During his four seasons on the team he had 6 receiving TDs and 5 rushing TDs. He majored in agriculture and life sciences.

Professional career

Minnesota Vikings
Carter entered the NFL as undrafted rookie free agent, signing with the Minnesota Vikings in 2006. He signed with the team on May 3, 2006. He spent time on their active roster and practice squad throughout the 2006 season. He only saw playing time during the final game of the season against the St. Louis Rams, though he failed to make any receptions. He attended training camp with the Vikings in 2007 but was cut at the end of camp.

Carolina Panthers
He was signed to the Panthers practice squad on September 3, 2007 and 2010.

In the Panthers' 2008 offseason practices, Carter's play has stood out. Carter later tore his ACL and was placed on injured reserve ending his season.

A restricted free agent in the 2009 offseason, Carter was not tendered a contract by the Panthers. However, the team eventually re-signed him on April 7. He was waived on August 24 when the team signed safety Kevin Kaesviharn.

Toronto Argonauts
On September 1, 2009, the Toronto Argonauts of the Canadian Football League signed Carter to a practice roster agreement. Soon after, he would eventually join the active roster.  Carter finished the 2009 CFL season with 43 receptions for 535 yards and 1 touchdown.  On June 24, 2010, Carter was released by the Argonauts.

References

External links
Toronto Argonauts bio
Carolina Panthers bio
Texas A&M bio

1982 births
Living people
People from Caldwell, Texas
Players of American football from Texas
American football wide receivers
Texas A&M Aggies football players
Minnesota Vikings players
Carolina Panthers players
Caldwell High School (Caldwell, Texas) alumni